Gagarin Air Force Academy is a Russian military aviation academy located in Monino, Moscow Oblast.

The academy prepares high-ranking military personnel for the Russian Air Force.

Among the academy alumni are around 700 Heroes of the Soviet Union (highest award in the USSR), more than 10 cosmonauts, and over 2000 military specialists from 21 foreign countries.

The schools provides regiment and division-level commanding officers to fill commanding, staff, navigation, logistics, communications and radar-support positions.

Alternative academy names in the English-language literature include Yuri Gagarin Military Air Academy and Yuri Gagarin Air Force Academy. In conversational speech often simply referred to as Gagarin Academy or Monino Academy. By late 2008, this academy and the N. Zhukovsky Aviation Engineering Academy both merged to become the Gagarin-Zhukovsky Military Combined Air Force Academy, but it still retained its Monino campus. Later in 2011 the Monino campus was closed.

History 

The academy was founded in 1940. It was named Air Force Academy in 1946. In 1968 it was named after Yuri Gagarin. In Soviet times, only the officers with a primary military education (летное училище- flight school) and holding the position of major could study at the academy. The collection of the serial and experimental Soviet aircraft (air force museum) served as a base for the studying by cadets of the academy. According to tradition, after the end of active military service as teachers of the academy, the officers became the guides in the museum. In 2008, Gagarin Air Force Academy was amalgamated with the Zhukovsky Air Force Engineering Academy. The new academy was titled "Zhukovsky – Gagarin Air Force Academy" – a federal government military educational institution of higher education run by the Russian Ministry of Defence. Since 2010 the full name is Russian Air Force Military Educational and Scientific Center "Air Force Academy named after Professor N.E. Zhukovsky and Y.A. Gagarin".

For the latest history of the academy see the article on Zhukovsky – Gagarin Air Force Academy

Leadership (Superintendent – commander and senior officer) 

 1940 – 
 1940-1941 – 
 1942 – Fyodor Astakhov
 1941–1942 – 
 1942–1944 – 
 1944–1946 – 
 1946–1950 – Fedor Falaleyev
 1950–1956 – 
 1956–1968 – Stepan Krasovsky
 1968–1973 – Sergei Rudenko
 1973–1988 – Nikolai Skomorokhov

Notable faculty 

  – professor, Major-General retired.
 Ivan Timokhovich – Doctor of Historical Sciences, professor, Major-General of aviation.

Notable alumni 

Vladimir Aleksenko – Twice Hero of the Soviet Union, Lieutenant-General.
 Vasily Andrianov – Twice Hero of the Soviet Union, Major-General.
 Leonid Beda – Twice Hero of the Soviet Union, Honored Military Pilot of the USSR (1971), Lieutenant-General of aviation (1972).
 Georgy Beregovoy – Pilot-Cosmonaut of the USSR, twice Hero of the Soviet Union.
 Mikhail Bondarenko – Twice Hero of the Soviet Union
Viktor Bondarev – Commander in Chief, Russian Federation Air Force (2011), Colonel-General. Hero of the Russian Federation.
Andrei Borovykh – Hero of the Soviet Union awarded twice, Colonel-General of aviation, Commander of the Aviation of the Air Defense Forces of the USSR (1969–1977).
Rafael del Pino – Deputy Chief of the Cuban Air and Air Defense Force
 Pavel Galkin - Hero of the Soviet Union
 Aleksei Gubarev – Pilot-Cosmonaut of the USSR, twice Hero of the Soviet Union Major-General.
Sigmund Jähn –  East German cosmonaut
 Mikhail Karpeyev - Hero of the Soviet Union
 Ivan Kozhedub – World War II ace-pilot, shoot down highest number of enemy aircraft (64) among pilots of Soviet forces. Thrice Hero of the Soviet Union; Marshal of Aviation (1985).
Anatoly Nedbaylo – Twice Hero of the Soviet Union, Deputy Superintendent of the Kiev Higher Air Force Engineering Academy (1968–1983), Major-General of aviation.
 Ivan Vorobyov – Twice Hero of the Soviet Union
Alexander Yefimov – Commander in Chief Air Force and Deputy Minister of Defense of the USSR (1984–1990); Marshal of Aviation (1975), Honored Military Pilot of the USSR (1970), Doctor of Military Sciences, professor.
Alexander Zelin – Commander in Chief, Russian Federation Air Force (2007), Colonel-General.

See also 
 Air force academy
Central Air Force Museum

References 

 Герои Советского Союза, окончившие ВВА имени Ю. А. Гагарина (A list of the academy alumni – Heroes of the Soviet Union)

Air force academies
Military academies of Russia
Military education and training in Russia
Soviet Air Forces education and training
Military units and formations awarded the Order of the Red Banner
Monuments and memorials to Yuri Gagarin